Malik Ghulam Arbi Khar (– d 4 March 2013) was a Pakistani politician who was a member of the National Assembly of Pakistan

References 

Year of birth missing
20th-century births
2013 deaths
People from Muzaffargarh District
Arbi
People from Muzaffargarh
Politicians from Muzaffargarh